This is a list of all penalty shoot-outs that have taken place in the final tournaments of the FIFA World Cup.

For knockout matches tied after regulation and extra time, the first editions of the World Cup up until 1958 used the rule of replaying the game. With fixtures becoming increasingly crowded, drawn matches from 1962 in quarter-finals and semi-finals would have been decided by drawing of lots. Replacement of the rules was first proposed in 1970 to the IFAB, and penalty shoot-outs were adopted for the new format of the 1978 tournament, although the replay rule for the final matches remained in place until 1982.

In practice, penalty shootouts did not occur before 1982. Three times, in 1994, 2006, and 2022, the World Cup title has been decided by a penalty shoot-out. Of the 35 shoot-outs that have taken place in the competition, only two reached the sudden death stage after still being tied at the end of "best of five kicks". Three times the shootouts required only 7 kicks, compared to the theoretical minimum of 6 kicks necessary.

Penalty shoot-outs

 Key
  = scored penalty
  = missed penalty
  = scored penalty ending the shoot-out
  = missed penalty ending the shoot-out
  = first penalty in the shoot-out
 horizontal line within a list of takers = beginning of the sudden death stage

Statistics

Shoot-out records
Most shoot-outs in a tournament
5 – 2022

Fewest shoot-outs in a tournament
0 – 1978

Most played shoot-out
 2 –  vs  (1998, 2006†)
 2 –  vs  (2014, 2022)

Most penalties in a shoot-out 
12 –  vs , 1982
12 –  vs , 1994

Fewest penalties in a shoot-out
7 –  vs , 1986
7 –  vs , 2006
7 –  vs , 2022

Fewest scores in a shoot-out
3 –  vs , 2006
3 –  vs , 2022

Most misses in a shoot-out
5 –  vs , 1990
5 –  vs , 2002
5 –  vs , 2006
5 –  vs , 2014
5 –  vs , 2018

Most consecutive misses in a shoot-out
 4 –  vs , 2002

Most scored in a shoot-out
9 –  vs , 1982
9 –  vs , 1986
9 –  vs , 1990
9 –  vs , 1994

Most consecutive scored in a shoot-out
 8 –  vs , 1990

Team records
Most played
 7 –  (1990 (x2), 1998, 2006, 2014, 2022 (x2))

Most played in one tournament
 2 –  (1990) 2/0, (2022) 2/0
 2 –  (2018) 2/0, (2022) 2/0
 2 –  (2002) 1/1
 2 –  (2014) 1/1
 2 –  (2014) 1/1
 2 –  (2018) 1/1

Most won
 6 –  (1990 (x2), 1998, 2014, 2022 (x2))

Most lost
 4 –  (1986, 2002, 2018, 2022)

Most consecutive wins
 4 –  (1982, 1986, 1990, 2006)
 4 –  (2018 (x2), 2022 (x2))

Most consecutive losses
 3 –  (1990, 1994†, 1998)
 3 –  (1990, 1998, 2006)
 3 –  (2002, 2018, 2022)

Most won without ever losing
 4 –  (1982, 1986, 1990, 2006)
 4 –  (2018 (x2), 2022 (x2))

Most lost without ever winning
 2 –  (1986, 1994) 
 2 –  (1990, 1994)
 2 –  (2010, 2022)

Most knockout matches played, never playing a shoot-out
 6 – 

Won shoot-out and eventually won the cup
  (1990)
  (1994†)
  (1998)
  (2006†)
  (2022† (x2))

Taker records
Most participations in shoot-outs
3 –  Roberto Baggio (1990, 1994†, 1998)
3 –  Luka Modrić (2018 (×2), 2022)
3 –  Lionel Messi (2014, 2022 (×2))

Most penalties scored
3 –  Luka Modrić (2018 (×2), 2022)
3 –  Lionel Messi (2014, 2022 (×2))

Most penalties scored in one tournament
2 –  José Serrizuela (1990)
2 –  Jorge Burruchaga (1990)
2 –  Fernando Hierro (2002)
2 –  Rubén Baraja (2002)
2 –  Celso Borges (2014)
2 –  Giancarlo González (2014)
2 –  Arjen Robben (2014)
2 –  Dirk Kuyt (2014)
2 –  Luka Modrić (2018)
2 –  Sergei Ignashevich (2018)
2 –  Ivan Rakitić (2018)
2 –  Nikola Vlašić (2022)
2 –  Lionel Messi (2022)
2 –  Gonzalo Montiel (2022)
2 –  Leandro Paredes (2022)

Most decider penalties scored
2 –  Ivan Rakitić (2018 (×2))

Goalkeeper records
Most participations in shoot-outs
2 –  Harald Schumacher (1982, 1986)
2 –  Sergio Goycochea (1990 (×2))
2 –  Cláudio Taffarel (1994†, 1998)
2 –  Gianluca Pagliuca (1994†, 1998)
2 –  Fabien Barthez (1998, 2006†)
2 –  Iker Casillas (2002 (×2))
2 –  Keylor Navas (2014 (×2))
2 –  Igor Akinfeev (2018 (×2))
2 –  Danijel Subašić (2018 (×2))
2 –  Dominik Livaković (2022 (×2))
2 –  Emiliano Martínez (2022† (×2))

Most penalties taken against
10 –  Sergio Goycochea
10 –  Fabien Barthez
10 –  Iker Casillas
10 –  Igor Akinfeev
10 –  Danijel Subašić

Most penalties scored against
8 –  Fabien Barthez

Most penalties missed against
5 –  Sergio Goycochea
5 –  Cláudio Taffarel
5 –  Danijel Subašić
5 –  Dominik Livaković

Most penalties saved
4 –  Harald Schumacher (2 vs France in 1982 and 2 vs Mexico in 1986)
4 –  Sergio Goycochea (2 vs Yugoslavia in 1990 and 2 vs Italy in 1990)
4 –  Danijel Subašić (3 vs Denmark in 2018 and 1 vs Russia in 2018)
4 –  Dominik Livaković (3 vs Japan in 2022 and 1 vs Brazil in 2022)

Most penalties saved in one shoot-out
3 –  Ricardo (vs England in 2006)
3 –  Danijel Subašić (vs Denmark in 2018)
3 –  Dominik Livaković (vs Japan in 2022)

Most decider penalties saved
2 –  Sergio Goycochea (1990 (×2))

By team

By tournament
Before the introduction of penalty shoot-outs in 1978:
Of the 35 knock-out matches from 1930 to 1938, 31 were decided within at most 120 minutes, the remaining 4 matches – one in 1934 and three in 1938 – were decided by replays.
There were no knock-out matches in 1950.
All 42 knock-out matches from 1954 to 1974 were decided within at most 120 minutes, so no replays or drawing of lots were needed.

Highest values in bold.

See also
List of Copa América penalty shoot-outs
List of FIFA Women's World Cup penalty shoot-outs
List of UEFA European Championship penalty shoot-outs

Notes

References

Match reports

Further reading
 

Penalty shoot-outs

FIFA World Cup records and statistics
penalty shoot-outs